Viburnum davidii, the David viburnum, is a species of flowering plant in the family Adoxaceae native to western China. Each leaf is deeply veined lengthwise with three curved lines. Round clusters of tiny white flowers are produced in late spring, followed in late summer and autumn by oval blue fruits. Both male and female plants are required to produce fruit.

V. davidii is one of several plants commemorating the 19th century French missionary and botanist Père Armand David.

This plant has gained the Royal Horticultural Society's Award of Garden Merit.

References

Flora of China
davidii